Chen Bo may refer to:

Chen Bo (diplomat) (born 1970), Chinese diplomat
Chen Bo (footballer) (born 1989), Chinese footballer

See also
Chen Tuan (died 989), semi-legendary Taoist figure, sometimes mispronounced as Chen Bo